The 1942 Argentine Primera División was the 51st season of top-flight football in Argentina. The season began on April 3 and ended on November 22.

There were 16 teams in the tournament, with the addition of Chacarita Juniors as promoted last year. River Plate won the championship while Tigre was relegated to Segunda División.

League standings

References

Argentine Primera División seasons
Argentine Primera Division
Primera Division